Petrus Kanisius Ojong (25 July 1920 – 31 May 1980), better known as P. K. Ojong, was an Indonesian journalist and businessman who was one of the founders of Kompas Gramedia Group, Indonesia's largest conglomerates and Kompas, one of Indonesia's most circulated daily newspapers, together with Jakob Oetama.

Early life 
Auwjong Peng Koen was born in Bukittinggi on July 25, 1920. He belonged to the Minnan (Hokkien) ethnic group with ancestry from Kinmen (Quemoy) island. Since childhood, his father, Auwjong Pauw, always taught him to be disciplined, economical, and hard working. His father was a farmer in Quemoy Island (part of Fujian Province, Taiwan). He moved to Sumatra, Dutch East Indies (now Indonesia) to get a better job.

Even though eventually Auwjong Pauw became a successful tobacco lord, he never pampered his children. His teachings had really shaped Peng Koen's character. He became a serious and very straightforward person.

Peng Koen attended the Hollandsche Chineesche School (primary school for the Chinese). During this time he was introduced to Catholic teachings, and finally converted to Catholicism and received the baptismal name of Andreas.

Higher education 
Peng Koen went to Hollandsche Chineesche Kweekschool to pursue his study. During this time, he was appointed as a leader of students organization. His task was to prepare reading material for the members. Other than that, he also planned the Chinese New Year celebration and year-end picnic.

He loved to read newspapers and magazines. Whereas other students just read the articles, Peng Koen tried to digest the writing styles and the ideas of every article. It is said that Peng Koen was a bit 'stiff' when he faced the opposite sex. One of his ex-classmates, Oei Yin Hwa, who owned a sweets shop in Cianjur, still remembers that Peng Koen was known as verstrooide professor or "forgetful professor".  He was also known for having a serious demeanor.

Career life 
Peng Koen was a teacher before he became a journalist. He studied at a teacher's college in Jakarta and worked as a teacher from 1940 to 1942. His career as teacher was ended when Japan attacked Indonesia and closed all the existing schools at that time.

He also worked for Star Weekly, a Malay-language weekly which targeted non-Chinese-speaking Indonesian Chinese, starting in 1946. He continued working there (while sometimes working for other magazines as well) until it was banned in 1960. During that time he also had an opportunity to work with Felix Tan.

Social Work 
PK Ojong actively took part in a social organization called Sin Ming Hui, which was established by Khoe Woen Sioe and Injo Beng Goat. The organisation was housed in one of Jakarta's best-known historic landmarks, Candra Naya.

Post life 
PK Ojong died in Jakarta in 1980. His biography, PK Ojong: Hidup Sederhana, Berpikir Mulia was published in 2001. The author of the book is Helen Ishwara. The book contains PK Ojong's experiences with the background of Old Order and New Order

See also 
 Famous Indonesian Chinese
 Indonesian Chinese

References

External links 

  PK OJONG Salah Satu Pendiri Kompas (http://www.solusihukum.com/tokoh/tokoh44.php)

1920 births
1980 deaths
20th-century journalists
Hokkien people
Indonesian Christians
Indonesian Hokkien people
Indonesian journalists
Indonesian people of Chinese descent
Indonesian Roman Catholics
Indonesian writers
Kompas Gramedia Group